Henry Morgan & Company (colloquially Morgan's) was a Canadian department store chain founded by Henry Morgan in 1845. The first store was located in Montreal, and expanded to include 11 stores in Ontario and Quebec before being bought by Hudson's Bay Company in 1960. The stores in Ontario were converted to Hudson's Bay Company stores that year and renamed The Bay in 1965; the remaining Morgan's stores in Quebec were renamed La Baie in 1972.

The flagship store was located in the Henry Morgan Building in Downtown Montreal, and remains a flagship property of the Hudson's Bay Company.

History
The first store was opened in Montreal in 1845 by Scottish immigrant Henry Morgan as Henry Morgan and Company at 200 Notre Dame Street (now 404 Notre Dame St. W), then moved in 1852 to 100 McGill Street (now 478 McGill St.; addition at 3-5 St. Joseph, now 610 Notre Dame W., in 1857) and again in 1866 to the north side of St. James Street (Saint Jacques Street) at Victoria Square. In 1891, they built a new flagship store at 585 Saint Catherine Street West in front of Phillips Square. This store opened as businesses were moving away from the old city centre and helped to make Saint Catherine Street the principal street for shops in Montreal.

The second store to operate under the Morgan's name opened in 1950 on Queen Mary Road in the Snowdon area of Montreal. Other stores then opened on the island of Montreal, and in several Ontario cities. Ownership of the store was originally split evenly between Henry Morgan and his partner, David Smith. Smith's portion was later purchased by Henry's brother, James Morgan. The store stayed under the ownership and management of the original Morgan brothers and their descendants for over 100 years of business.

Morgan's was purchased in 1960 by Hudson's Bay Company. In 1964, the stores in Ontario were converted to the new name – The Bay. At that point, the Morgan's logo was replaced with a new one with a similar design to The Bay's for the Quebec stores still operating under the Morgan's name. The Quebec stores were converted on June 19, 1972.

1945 Commemorative Wedgwood Bowl
In 1945, Morgan's Department Store commissioned a Wedgwood bowl, designed by Keith Murray, to commemorate the store's 100th anniversary in Montreal.  Black and white transfer prints on the front and back contrast Montreal as it was in 1845 and in 1945. Relief portraits on each side of Jean Baptiste and John Bull are surrounded by colourful maple leaves, shamrock, rose, thistle, and fleur-de-lis and celebrate the city's French and English heritage. The inside of the bowl is decorated with the coat of arms and motto Concordia Salus (Salvation Through Harmony), colourful maple leaves, and the following English and French inscriptions around the upper rim: "Discovered by Jacques Cartier in 1534, Founded by Maisonneuve in 1642, Decouvert par Jacques Cartier en 1534, and Fonde par Maisonneuve en 1642". The underside of the bowl has the Morgan's and Wedgwood logos and provides the population data for Montreal in 1845 (45,000) and 1945 (1,500,000). This footed bowl measures 12 1/4" in diameter, and is 6 3/4" high.

Legacy
Three former Morgan's stores are still in operation as The Bay: the flagship in downtown Montreal and the suburban locations in Eglinton Square Shopping Centre and Rockland Centre (though the latter relocated in 1983 within the same mall). The Montreal locations in the Boulevard Shopping Centre and Dorval Gardens shopping malls lasted until 2018 and 2021 respectively. In Ontario, virtually all The Bay stores, that had previously been Morgan's locations, were closed between the 1970s and 2000s decades.

Locations
 Montreal
 St. Catherine St.
 Queen Mary Road
 Le Boulevard Shopping Centre
 Dorval Gardens
 Centre Rockland
 Toronto
 Lawrence Plaza
 Cloverdale Mall
 Eglinton Square
 Bloor/Yonge
 Hamilton
 Greater Hamilton Shopping Centre
 Ottawa
 Sparks Street

Gallery

See also
Hudson's Bay Company
List of Canadian department stores
The Bay

References

External links
Morgan's history at Hudson's Bay Company website

Canadian companies established in 1845
Retail companies established in 1845
Retail companies disestablished in 1972
Defunct retail companies of Canada
Department stores of Canada
Hudson's Bay Company
Landmarks in Montreal
1972 disestablishments in Quebec
Canadian companies disestablished in 1972